Kaitlin "Katie" Burt (born 26 January 1997) is an American ice hockey goaltender, currently playing in the Premier Hockey Federation (PHF) with the Metropolitan Riveters. She was selected first overall by the Boston Pride in the 2017 NWHL Draft.

Playing career

NCAA 
Following her freshman season with the Boston College Eagles women's ice hockey program, she captured the Hockey East Goaltending Championship. She was recognized as a Hockey East All-Rookie Team selection and was also a Second Team All-Star selection. She had 35 starts and recorded a 1.11 goals against average (GAA).

As a sophomore, she captured the Hockey East Goaltending Championship for the second straight year. She posted a program record 35-1-0 record, losing her only game in the 2016 NCAA Frozen Four championship game. In Hockey East play, she recorded an undefeated mark of 20-0-0.

In 2018, she broke Noora Räty's record for all-time NCAA wins.

Professional 
Selected first overall in the 2017 NWHL Draft, Burt signed her first professional contract on June 25, 2018 with the Boston Pride of the National Women's Hockey League (NWHL; rebranded as PHF in 2021).  The Pride had obtained the first round pick of the Connecticut Whale in a trade that sent Zoe Hickel to the Whale on February 7, 2017. Burt played 16 games in her rookie season with the Pride, posting a .920 SV% and 2.26 GAA. She was named to the 2019 NWHL All-Star Game and as a finalist for the NWHL Goaltender of the Year award.

In May 2019, she left the PHF to join the New England chapter of the Professional Women's Hockey Players Association (PWHPA).

Burt returned to the Boston Pride in the 2021–22 PHF season and won the 2022 Isobel Cup with the team.

International 
Burt competed for the United States women's national under-18 ice hockey team in 2014 and 2015. At the 2014 IIHF World Women's U18 Championship, Burt emerged with a silver medal. The following year, she would help the US capture the gold at the 2015 IIHF World Women's U18 Championship. Burt competed for Team Americas at the 2019 Aurora Games.

Personal life 

Burt has a degree in economics. She previously worked as a ball girl for the Boston Red Sox.

Career Statistics 

Sources:

Awards and honours 

Independent School League co-MVP (2011–12)
ACC Academic Honor Roll (2014–15)
Hockey East All-Rookie Team (2014–15)
Hockey East Second Team All-Star (2014–15)
Hockey East Goaltending Champion (2014–15)
Boston College Athletic Director's Award for Academic Achievement (2015–16)

References

External links 
 

1997 births
Living people
American women's ice hockey goaltenders
Boston College Eagles women's ice hockey players
Boston Pride players
Ice hockey players from Massachusetts
Metropolitan Riveters players
Sportspeople from Lynn, Massachusetts
Professional Women's Hockey Players Association players